The league is run by the British Amateur Rugby League Association (BARLA). Teams from the Cumberland league can apply for election to the National Conference League if they meet minimum criteria.

History
The Cumberland League has been in existence, in one form or another, since 1899. Millom, in 1897, was the first club in the county to defect from rugby union to Northern Union, they were followed a year later by Workington, Maryport, Whitehaven, Seaton, Brookland Rovers and Wath Brow. The first three named joined with Lancaster and the Furness clubs Barrow, Dalton and Askam to form the North Western League in 1898/99. The first champions were Millom who finished just ahead of Barrow.

On 10 May 1899 the Cumberland clubs met at the Grapes Hotel in Workington and agreed to form a Cumberland Senior League for the following season. They voted W.E. Mason (Whitehaven) to Chair the new competition and R. Nixon (Maryport) was elected Hon. Secretary.

The participants in that first season, 1899/1900, were Brookland Rovers, Maryport, Seaton, Whitehaven, Whitehaven Rec and Workington. Neither of the Whitehaven clubs nor Workington have any connection with Whitehaven and Workington Town who currently play in the Co-operative Championship and Championship One respectively.

The first winners were the Maryport.

2014 structure

NB:Maryport A failed to complete the season

2013 structure

2012 Structure

Division One

Division two

NB: Seaton Rangers A and Broughton Red Rose from division 1 and Salterbeck Storm from division 2 failed to complete the season.

Past winners

Cumberland Senior League

Division Two

1993-94 Glasson Rangers
1994-95 Unknown
1995-96 Wath Brow Hornets
1996-97 Unknown
1997-98 Flimby
1998-99 Seaton Rangers
1999-00 Maryport
2000-01 Seaton Rangers
2001-02 Wath Brow Hornets
2002-03 Unknown
2003-04 Maryport
2004-05 Carlisle Saints
2005-06 Great Clifton Lions 
2006-07 Distington
2007-08 Cockermouth Titans
2008-09 Lowca
2009-10 Cockermouth Titans 
2010-11 Seaton Rangers A
2012 Flimby

Dale Campbell Savours Cup
2005-06 Great Clifton Lions
2006-07 Glasson Rangers
2007-08 Cockermouth Titans
2008-09 Lowca

See also

 Barrow & District League
 British Amateur Rugby League Association
 British rugby league system
 CMS Yorkshire league
 Cumbria County Cup (Rugby League)
 Cumbria Men's League
 Hull & District League
 National Conference League
 North West Counties
 Pennine League

External links
 BARLA Official Website

Rugby league in Cumbria
BARLA competitions
Sports leagues established in 1899
1899 establishments in England